The Stein Brewery was a Slovak brewery, based in Bratislava. It was founded between 1871 and 1876 and closed in 2007. Eventually, Stein became the third largest brewery in Czechoslovakia. The brand is still produced by Steiger Brewery in Vyhne, Slovakia.

Beer products

 8° Light beer
 10° Draught beer
 12° Lager beer 
 8° Light beer Grošák
 Radler – beer with lemon flavour, containing about 2.5% alcohol

Other products
 Steincola – fizzy soft drink
 Kofola – fizzy soft drink with the flavour of KOFO original

History
 1873 – Stein Brewery was founded by Ian Andrew Melvin Stein
 1873 – Stein brewery wins medal in Vienna
 1878 – Medal at the world fair in Paris
 World War II – Brewery production increased during the war.  Production slowed for last 6 months as German Troops withdrew
 1945 – Russian General shoots holes in tanks to keep troops from getting drunk.  Production restarts with beer being produced at a much lower alcohol content.  The first "light" beer
 1948 – Nationalisation in Czechoslovakia, brewery was reorganised to the company Západoslovenské pivovary, n.p. Bratislava (in English: Western Slovakia Breweries, national company Bratislava)
 1989 – Fall of socialism in Czechoslovakia, brewery returned to original name Stein, still as a state company
 1995 – Stein is transformed into the employees joint stock company S.t.e.i.n. a.s.
 2007 – End of the beer production in Bratislava. Stein is now produced by Steiger Brewery in Vyhne.

References

External links
 Official website of Stein Brewery

Beer in Slovakia
Companies of Czechoslovakia
Slovak brands